The 2008–09 Biathlon World Cup was a multi-race tournament over a season of biathlon, organised by the International Biathlon Union. The season started on 2 December 2008 in Östersund, Sweden and ends on 29 March 2009 in Khanty-Mansiysk, Russia.

Calendar 
Below is the World Cup calendar for the 2008–09 season.

World Cup podiums

Men

Women

Men's team

Women's team

Mixed

Standings: Men

Overall 

Final standings after 26 races.

Individual 

Final standings after 4 races.

Sprint 

Final standings after 10 races.

Pursuit 

Final standings after 7 races.

Mass start 

Final standings after 5 races.

Relay 

Final standings after 6 races.

Nation 

Final standings after 20 races.

Standings: Women

Overall 

Final standings after 26 races.

Individual 

Final standings after 4 races.

Sprint 

Final standings after 10 races.

Pursuit 

Final standings after 7 races.

Mass start 

Final standings after 5 races.

Relay 

Final standings after 6 races.

Nation 

Final standings after 20 races.

Medal table

Achievements
First World Cup career victory
, 25, in her 3rd season — the WC 1 Sprint in Östersund; also her first individual podium
, 29, in her 9th season — the WC 2 Sprint in Hochfilzen; first podium was 2004-05 Pursuit in Antholz-Anterselva
, 30, in her 13th season — the WC 3 Individual in Hochfilzen; also her first individual podium
, 25, in her 3rd season — the WC 6 Pursuit in Antholz-Anterselva; also her first individual podium
, 23, in his 4th season — the WC 6 Mass Start in Antholz-Anterselva; also his first individual podium
, 20, in his 2nd season — the WCh  Mass Start in Pyeong Chang; first podium was 2008-09 Sprint in Ruhpolding
, 23, in his 4th season — the WC 7 Individual in Vancouver; also his first individual podium
, 22, in his 1st season — the WC 9 Sprint in Khanty-Mansiysk; also his first individual podium
, 22, in her 1st season — the WC 9 Sprint in Khanty-Mansiysk; also her first individual podium
,  25, in his 6th season — the WC 9 Mass Start in Khanty-Mansiysk; first podium was 2008-09 Pursuit in Antholz-Anterselva

First World Cup podium
,  22, in her 3rd season — no. 2 in the WC 3 Sprint in Hochfilzen
,  22, in her 3rd season — no. 3 in the WC 5 Sprint in Ruhpolding
,  21, in his 3rd season — no. 3 in the WCh  Individual in Pyeong Chang
,  28, in her 6th season — no. 2 in the WCh  Individual in Pyeong Chang
,  24, in her 2nd season — no. 2 in the WCh  Mass Start in Pyeong Chang
,  22, in his 1st season — no. 2 in the WC 7 Individual in Vancouver
,  32, in his 13th season — no. 3 in the WC 7 Individual in Vancouver
,  20, in her 2nd season — no. 3 in the WC 8 Pursuit in Trondheim
,  22, in her 2nd season — no. 3 in the WC 9 Pursuit in Khanty-Mansiysk

Victory in this World Cup (all-time number of victories in parentheses)

Men
 , 7 (88) first places
 , 5 (11) first places
 , 2 (11) first places
 , 2 (5) first places
 , 2 (4) first places
 , 1 (5) first place
 , 1 (4) first place
 , 1 (2) first place
 , 1 (1) first place
 , 1 (1) first place
 , 1 (1) first place
 , 1 (1) first place
 , 1 (1) first place

Women
 , 4 (5) first places
 , 3 (21) first places
 , 3 (14) first places
 , 3 (3) first places
 , 2 (16) first places
 , 2 (15) first places
 , 2 (8) first places
 , 2 (4) first places
 , 1 (4) first place
 , 1 (1) first place
 , 1 (1) first place
 , 1 (1) first place
 , 1 (1) first place

Retirements
Following notable biathletes retired after the 2008–09 season:

References

External links
IBU official site

 
World Cup
World Cup
Biathlon World Cup